Tundama may refer to:
 Tundama, last cacique of Tundama, Colombia
 Duitama, modern name of Tundama, seat of the cacique
 Tundama Province, the province of which Duitama is the capital